Tarhan District is a district (bakhsh) in Kuhdasht County, Lorestan Province, Iran. At the 2006 census, its population was 17,648, in 3,458 families.  The District has one city: Garab.  The District contains two Rural Districts: Tarhan-e Gharbi Rural District and Tarhan-e Sharqi Rural District.

References 

Districts of Lorestan Province
Kuhdasht County